Princess Saovabhark Nariratana, Princess consort of Siam, born Princess Piu Ladavalya of Siam (26 January 1854 – 21 July 1887) was a consort of Chulalongkorn, the King of Siam.

She was a daughter of Ladavalya, Prince Bhumindra Bhakdi and Lady Chin.

Ancestors

References 

1854 births
1887 deaths
Thai female Phra Ong Chao
Thai princesses consort
People from Bangkok
19th-century Thai women
19th-century Chakri dynasty
Thai female Mom Chao